Alexandr Dolgopolov was the defending champion but lost in the semifinals to Marin Čilić, who won the title by beating Marcel Granollers 6–4, 6–2 in the final.

Seeds
The top four seeds receive a bye into the second round.

Draw

Finals

Top half

Bottom half

Qualifying

Seeds

Qualifiers

Draw

First qualifier

Second qualifier

Third qualifier

Fourth qualifier

References
 Main Draw
 Qualifying Draw

ATP Vegeta Croatia Open Umag - Singles
2012 Singles